César Augusto Mena Mosquera (born 15 October 1988) is a Colombian former professional footballer who played as a defender.

External links
 
 

1988 births
Living people
Colombian footballers
Association football defenders
Atlético Bello footballers
Godoy Cruz Antonio Tomba footballers
Deportivo Pereira footballers
Total Chalaco footballers
Olaria Atlético Clube players
Centro Atlético Fénix players
Cúcuta Deportivo footballers
Santiago Morning footballers
Primera B de Chile players
Argentine Primera División players
Categoría Primera A players
Colombian expatriate footballers
Colombian expatriate sportspeople in Chile
Expatriate footballers in Chile
Colombian expatriate sportspeople in Argentina
Expatriate footballers in Argentina
Colombian expatriate sportspeople in Uruguay
Expatriate footballers in Uruguay
Colombian expatriate sportspeople in Brazil
Expatriate footballers in Brazil
Colombian expatriate sportspeople in Peru
Expatriate footballers in Peru
Colombian expatriate sportspeople in Bolivia
Expatriate footballers in Bolivia
Footballers from Bogotá